Gary Richard Deegan (born 28 September 1987) is an Irish professional footballer who plays as a midfielder for League of Ireland Premier Division club Drogheda United. Beginning his career in his native Ireland, he played in the Scottish Premiership for Hibernian and various clubs in all three divisions of the English Football League.

Career

Ireland
Deegan started his career with Shelbourne. He made one competitive appearance for their first team, as a second-half substitute in a UEFA Intertoto Cup game against FK Vetra of Lithuania at Tolka Park on 24 June 2006, a match Shelbourne comfortably won 4–0. Soon after, Deegan was sent on loan to First Division strugglers Kilkenny City in July 2006 to gain experience and regular first team football.

Deegan left Shelbourne during the winter of 2006 following their financial meltdown and subsequently joined Longford Town in February 2007. Deegan immediately broke into Longford's starting XI, making 35 league and cup appearances over the course of the season while scoring 3 goals. Following a difficult season on and off the pitch, Longford were relegated to the First Division, but Deegan helped Longford to the 2007 FAI Cup Final, which he missed due to a suspension. Deegan signed for Galway United on a full-time basis on 24 January 2008, but was released on 9 July due to financial difficulties at Galway.

Deegan was not to stay out of football for long as Pat Fenlon swooped to sign Deegan for Dublin club Bohemians until the end of the 2008 season. He made his debut for the Gypsies in a 3–0 win over Cobh Ramblers at Dalymount Park on 1 August. He scored his first goal for the club in a 2–0 win over former club Galway on 22 August. Deegan made himself a regular in the Bohs' starting XI and his tremendous form was rewarded when he was named the Soccer Writers Association of Ireland (SWAI) Player of the Month for September. The good times continued as a 2–1 win over Drogheda United secured the league title for Bohemians and a winners medal for Deegan. Deegan's outstanding form was rewarded when he was voted on to the Eircom League of Ireland Premier Division Team for 2008, receiving 28% of the votes for the centre midfield position.

Deegan began the 2009 season well for Bohs with some powerful performances in midfield. He also excelled in Bohs UEFA Champions League qualifying tie against Red Bull Salzburg. However Deegan and Bohs would depart that competition, cruelly losing 2–1 on aggregate. Worse was to come for Deegan as he got sent off twice in the space of three weeks and served a lengthy suspension. However, he returned for the final games of the season and picked up his second League of Ireland winners medal as Bohs pipped deadly rivals Shamrock Rovers to the title by four points. Deegan's talent was rewarded at the season's end when he was voted on to the 2009 PFAI Team of the Year.

Coventry City
It was announced on 21 December 2009 he would be signing for English Championship club Coventry City on 4 January 2010 on a three and a half-year deal. Deegan made his debut for Coventry as a second-half substitute against Barnsley on 9 January 2010. He scored his first goal for Coventry on his second start for the club against Queens Park Rangers in a 1–0 win for Coventry on 13 February 2010. His second goal for the club was a late equaliser in the M69 derby on 21 March 2010, with the match finishing 2–2.

During the 2010–11 pre-season Deegan suffered a stress fracture of the ankle, putting him out of action for the duration of the season, only to come on as a substitute in the final game of the season in a 2–2 draw against Norwich City. In 2012 Deegan was the subject of controversy after tweeting a pro-IRA slogan. He was banned for two weeks by the club, pending the outcome of an internal investigation.

Hibernian
Deegan signed for Hibernian, managed by Pat Fenlon (which the pair worked together at Bohemians), in August 2012 on a one-year deal. After joining, Fenlon said that he believed Deegan would become a fan favourite at the club. Deegan made his debut, making his first start and playing 90 minutes, in a 1–1 draw against Edinburgh derby rivals Heart of Midlothian. He helped the club improve its form in the early part of the 2012–13 season, but Deegan then suffered a broken jaw when he was the victim of an unprovoked attack in Edinburgh city centre. Deegan resumed training exercises in late November. A 27-year-old man was charged with assault in connection with the incident in December. Deegan said that his injury left him only able to eat soup for five weeks. Deegan made his return, coming on as a substitute, in a 3–2 loss against Motherwell on 15 December 2012. Deegan scored his first Hibs goal with a 30-yard strike in the fifth round of the Scottish Cup in a 1–0 victory over Aberdeen. He left Hibs at the end of his contract, after failing to secure a regular first team place.

Northampton Town
On 25 July 2013, Deegan joined Northampton Town on a one-year deal after a successful trial.

Southend United
Deegan joined Southend United on 22 August 2014 on a free transfer. He made his début for the club against AFC Wimbledon and throughout the 2014–15 season established himself as a favourite among the fans due to the commitment and passion that he displayed on the pitch as well as his iconic beard.

On 4 August 2015 Deegan signed a one-year contract with an option for a second year.

In May 2016, Deegan had his contract extended after the clause was triggered, although the following day, Southend announced that his contract had been terminated by mutual consent after Deegan wanted manager Phil Brown to guarantee him first team football, which Brown refused to do.

Shrewsbury Town
After leaving Southend, Deegan joined fellow League One side Shrewsbury Town. Despite being a first-team regular under Micky Mellon and his successor Paul Hurst as Shrewsbury avoided relegation, he was transfer-listed halfway through his two-year contract at the club, although Hurst commented "he's a man and true to his word... there's been no falling-out". Deegan left the club by mutual consent on 31 May 2017.

Cambridge United
Deegan signed a two-year contract at League Two side Cambridge United on 1 June 2017, following his departure from Shrewsbury Town the previous day.

He was offered a new contract by Cambridge United at the end of the 2018–19 season.

In July 2019 it was announced that he was suffering from blood poisoning.

Return To Shelbourne
Deegan signed a contract at League of Ireland Premier Division side Shelbourne, the club where he started his senior career, on 31 December 2019, following his departure from Cambridge United just minutes after it was announced both parties had agreed to terminate Deegan's contract. He scored 3 goals in 18 league appearances as Shelbourne were relegated from the Premier Division after just one season back in the top flight. His contract ran out and he was released by the club in October 2020.

Drogheda United

2021 season
On 12 December 2020, Deegan signed a one year deal with League Of Ireland First Division champions and newly promoted Premier Division outfit Drogheda United under manager Tim Clancy, a former teammate of Deegan's at Hibernian. He featured in 32 of the club's 36 league games throughout the season, playing 2,787 minutes in total, and was nominated for the SSE Airtricity Player of the Month award in May.

2022 season
After finishing in 7th place and avoiding relegation, Deegan signed a one year contract extension at the club for the 2022 season, under new manager Kevin Doherty, who was previously assistant manager under Tim Clancy and another former teammate of Deegan's during their time together at Longford Town. He scored his first goal for the club against UCD on 4 March 2022. On 27 May, in the absence of Dane Massey, he was given the captain's armband for the first time as Drogheda drew 1-1 away to Bohemians. In August 2022, he received another nomination for SSE Airtricity Player of the Month. Deegan served 3 suspensions for bookings, but still managed 35 appearances throughout the season as Drogheda avoided relegation by finishing in 8th place.

2023 season
On 9 December 2022, Deegan signed a new contract with the club, being named as club captain for the 2023 season

Career statistics

Honours
Galway United
Connacht Senior Cup (1): 2008

Bohemians
League of Ireland (2): 2008, 2009
FAI Cup (1): 2008

Southend United
Football League Two play-offs: 2014–15

Notes

References

External links

1987 births
League of Ireland players
Galway United F.C. (1937–2011) players
Kilkenny City A.F.C. players
Living people
Longford Town F.C. players
Association footballers from Dublin (city)
Shelbourne F.C. players
Bohemian F.C. players
Drogheda United F.C. players
Association football midfielders
Republic of Ireland association footballers
Coventry City F.C. players
English Football League players
Hibernian F.C. players
Northampton Town F.C. players
Southend United F.C. players
Shrewsbury Town F.C. players
Cambridge United F.C. players
Scottish Premier League players
Republic of Ireland expatriate association footballers
Expatriate footballers in England
Irish expatriate sportspeople in England